is the mayor of Kōtō, Tokyo. He is also an advisor to the head of the Tokyo Olympic Organizing Committee.

Early life and career
He was born in 1943 in Kōtō city, and attended Waseda University, graduating from the faculty of commerce in 1967. In 1983 he was elected as a member of the Kōtō City Assembly and served two terms. In 1991 he was elected as a member of the Tokyo Metropolitan Assembly and served five terms. He became mayor of Kōtō in 2011. He is supported by the Liberal Democratic Party and Komeito.

Mayoral activities
In 2011 he accepted the burying of 3,000 tons of radiation-tainted sludge being buried in a breakwater project in Tokyo bay.

In 2013 Yamazaki suggested introducing joint "Tokyo Wangan" (Tokyo Bay area) car license plates with six Tokyo Wards.

After Tokyo was selected for the 2020 Olympics, Yamazaki stated that he wanted to make Kōtō the "Olympic city" and move forward with plans for the 5.2 Hachigo line subway from Toyosu to Toyo.

In 2014 he considered the construction of a cable car from Shiodome to Toyosu.

References

Living people
1943 births
Waseda University alumni
Members of the Tokyo Metropolitan Assembly
Mayors of places in Tokyo